Loukas Fourlas (born August21, 1969) is a Cypriot journalist and politician who has been serving as a Member of the European Parliament for the Democratic Rally since 2019.

In parliament, Fourlas serves on the Committee on Employment and Social Affairs. In 2020, he also joined the Special Committee on Beating Cancer.

In addition to his committee assignments, Fourlas is part of the Parliament’s delegation to the EU-Turkey Joint Parliamentary Committee, the European Parliament Intergroup on Disability and the European Parliament Intergroup on Trade Unions.

References

Living people
MEPs for Cyprus 2019–2024
Democratic Rally MEPs
Democratic Rally politicians
1969 births